Eric Russel Moore (25 December 1925 – 25 July 2017) was an Australian rules footballer who played for the Fitzroy Football Club in the Victorian Football League (VFL).

Notes

External links 

1925 births
2017 deaths
Australian rules footballers from Victoria (Australia)
Fitzroy Football Club players